The World Coal Association (WCA) is an international non-profit, non-governmental association based in London, United Kingdom. It was created to represent the global coal industry. The association was formerly called the World Coal Institute (WCI) but changed its name in November 2010. The WCA undertakes lobbying, organises workshops, and provides coal information to decision makers in international energy and environmental policy and research discussions, as well as supplying information to the general public and educational organisations on the benefits and issues surrounding the use of coal. It also promotes clean coal technologies.

It has participated in a number of United Nations and International Energy Agency (IEA) workshops, boards, and forums, including the UN Commission on Sustainable Development, the UN Framework Convention on Climate Change, the IEA Working Party on Fossil Fuels, and the IEA Coal Industry Advisory Board. It is also part of the Carbon Sequestration Leadership Forum.

It is co-author of a report on the future of coal in ASEAN nations. 

In 2019, the WCA appoints a new CEO, Michelle Manook who previously worked in mining services firm Orica.

See also 
 Carbon capture and storage
 Clean coal
 Coal lobby
 Coal mining
 Coal-mining region

References

External links 
 World Coal Association
 World Coal Association members

Coal in the United Kingdom
Coal organizations
International energy organizations
International organisations based in London
Organisations based in the City of Westminster
Science and technology in London